Sir Thomas Tyrwhitt (1762 – 24 February 1833) was an English politician.  He was a Member of Parliament (MP) from 1796 to 1812.

Career
Educated at Eton College and Christ Church, Oxford, after serving as private secretary to the Prince of Wales, Tyrwhitt was elected Member of Parliament (MP) for Okehampton in 1796. Tyrwhitt was responsible for the construction of several roads across Dartmoor, a hamlet called Princetown named in honour of the Prince of Wales, a prison for prisoners of war captured during the Napoleonic Wars now known as HM Prison Dartmoor, as well as the Plymouth and Dartmoor Railway. He became Auditor of the Duchy of Cornwall in 1796 and Lord Warden of the Stannaries in 1803.

He was elected Member of Parliament for Portarlington in 1802 and Plymouth in 1806. In retirement he became Gentleman Usher of the Black Rod.

References

External links
 

|-

|-

|-

|-

|-

1762 births
1833 deaths
People educated at Eton College
Alumni of Christ Church, Oxford
British MPs 1796–1800
UK MPs 1801–1802
UK MPs 1802–1806
UK MPs 1806–1807
UK MPs 1807–1812
Members of the Parliament of Great Britain for Okehampton
Members of the Parliament of the United Kingdom for Plymouth
Members of the Parliament of the United Kingdom for Portarlington